Kabjavan (also Romanized as Kabjavān) is a village in Keraj Rural District, in the Central District of Isfahan County, Isfahan Province, Iran. At the 2006 census, its population was 545, in 128 families.

References 

Populated places in Isfahan County